Mohammed Abu Abdallah ibn Abd al-Rahman ibn Zakri al-Fasi (died 1731) was a Moroccan writer of the 18th century. He is the author of commentaries on works of grammar, theology and mysticism, didactic poems and prose work. His biography (Al-arf al-sihri fi bad fadail) was written by al-Ghassani al-Wazir (1653–1733).

References

Moroccan writers
Moroccan letter writers
1731 deaths
People from Fez, Morocco
18th-century Moroccan people
Moroccan scholars
Year of birth unknown